The Cwm Llwyd Fault is a fault in the west of the Black Mountain of South Wales. It runs north, parallel to the A4069 road, for over 4 km from near Brynaman to meet the Carreg Cennen Disturbance near Brest Cwm Llwyd.  It moved as a sinistral (left lateral) strike-slip fault during the Variscan Orogeny. Together with the Llwyn Celyn Fault it formed a left-stepping offset that created a pull apart structure, which preserved the Cwm Llwyd Outlier of Namurian rocks.

See also
List of geological faults of Wales

References

Geology of Wales